James William Hardesty (born November 28, 1948) served as a justice of the Nevada Supreme Court. He was elected in 2004, and reelected in 2010 and 2016. He earned a Bachelor of Science degree from University of Nevada and a Juris Doctor from the McGeorge School of Law.

He defeated Cynthia Dianne Steel in the 2004 election 46.12% to 33.53%, and was unopposed in his 2010 re-election.

He was sworn in as Chief Justice of the Nevada Supreme Court on January 4, 2021.

References

|-

|-

|-

1948 births
Living people
21st-century American judges
Chief Justices of the Nevada Supreme Court
Justices of the Nevada Supreme Court
McGeorge School of Law alumni
Place of birth missing (living people)
University of Nevada, Reno alumni